WLGC (1520 AM) was a news radio station licensed to Greenup, Kentucky while their studio is located in Ashland, Kentucky. The station's transmitter, like WLGC-FM, was in Greenup. The station was owned by Greenup County Broadcasting, Inc.

History
The station went on the air as WLGC on May 30, 1984. On July 17, 1989, the station changed its call sign to WTCV. However, they returned to the WLGC callsign on April 26, 1993.

On January 13, 2014, concurrent with WLGC-FM's rebranding as "Kool Hits 105.7", WLGC became an All-news radio format and was rebranded as "Kool Hits 105.7 NewsChannel". In addition to local news, the station also features news broadcasts from the Associated Press Radio Network and the Kentucky News Network.

At the request of licensee Greenup County Broadcasting, the Federal Communications Commission cancelled WLGC's over the air broadcasting license on February 1, 2017. The former AM station is still available as an online only feed from WLGC's website and smartphone app.

References

External link
FCC Station Search Details: DWLGC (Facility ID: 25223)

LGC
Defunct radio stations in the United States
Radio stations established in 1985
1985 establishments in Kentucky
Radio stations disestablished in 2017
2017 disestablishments in Kentucky
LGC
LGC
Greenup County, Kentucky